Ellis Stafford (17 August 1929 – 29 October 2007) was an English footballer.

He played for Scarborough and Peterborough United.

Notes

1929 births
2007 deaths
Footballers from Sheffield
English footballers
Association football fullbacks
Scarborough F.C. players
Peterborough United F.C. players
English Football League players